Saskylakh (Saaskılaax) is a rural locality (a selo) and the administrative center of Anabarsky District in the Sakha Republic, Russia.  Its population as of the 2010 Census was 2,317, up from 1,985 recorded during the 2002 Census and further up from 1,856 recorded during the 1989 Census.

Geography
Saskylakh is located on the right bank of the Anabar River, downstream from the confluence with the Udya. It is one of the main ports in the river.

History
It was founded in 1930 as a part of Soviet efforts to settle the nomadic Yakuts, Evenks, and Dolgans who lived in the area.

Transportation
In the opposite direction, the road also continues downstream along the Anabar to Yuryung-Khaya.

There is also a small airport a few kilometers south.

Climate
Despite lying well inside the Arctic Circle, Saskylakh has a subarctic climate (Köppen climate classification Dfc) with very short, mild summers and severely cold winters. Precipitation is moderate; it falls mostly as rain in summer and mainly as snow throughout the rest of the year. Summers get above  due to warm spells of southerly winds, which has rendered an all-time record of  whereas the Arctic Ocean to its north remains extremely chilly even when ice-free in summer. As a result, summers are highly variable. In winter, temperatures are more stable, with cold extremes not deviating much from the average lows. Brief spells of maritime air can bring temperatures a lot less cold, but there are still eight reliable months below freezing. There is also a strong seasonal lag due to the late thawing of the ice pack to the north. As a result, May is still a winter month even with midnight sun.

References

Notes

Sources
Official website of the Sakha Republic. Registry of the Administrative-Territorial Divisions of the Sakha Republic. Anabarsky District. 

Rural localities in the Sakha Republic
Road-inaccessible communities of the Sakha Republic
North Siberian Lowland